The 1896 Cork Senior Hurling Championship was the 10th staging of the Cork Senior Hurling Championship since its establishment by the Cork County Board in 1887.

Blackrock were the defending champions, however, they were defeated by Redmonds in the first round of the championship.

On 6 December 1896, Ballyhea won the championship following a 6-10 to 1-2 defeat of Ballygarvan in the final. This remains their only championship title.

Results

Semi-finals

Final

Miscellaneous

 Ballyhea win their first title and what remains their only championship title.
 Ballyhea become only the second non city club to win the title.

References

Cork Senior Hurling Championship
Cork Senior Hurling Championship